Fort Rock Cave was the site of the earliest evidence of human habitation in the US state of Oregon before the excavation of Paisley Caves.  Fort Rock Cave featured numerous well-preserved sagebrush sandals, ranging from 9,000 to 13,000 years old.
Fort Rock Cave was declared a National Historic Landmark in 1961, and added to the National Register of Historic Places in 1966.

The cave was found on Reub Long's ranch. It was formerly known as Menkenmaier Cave and Cow Cave.

Description
Fort Rock Cave sits in the Fort Rock formation, and shares geological similarities to its surroundings, with presence of Hayes Butte basalt, and exposed Pliocene-era lava. Additionally, there is pumice and ash from Mount Mazama (deposited by the explosion forming Crater Lake about 7600 years ago). The opening of the cave is approximately 70 feet across, with a depth of near 60 feet, making it the largest cave in the Fort Rock area. Oriented facing the southeast, the combination of depth and position protect it from winds and summer heat. Archaeological excavators identified four stratum of material in the cave: a bottom gravel layer, a silty brown layer, pumice and ash from Mt. Mazama, topped by a light tan sandy layer. Parts of the cave are collapsed, leaving some large boulders, which were involved in the excavations.

Excavations
Excavations of the site began in 1938 led by Luther Cressman and his team of University of Oregon, and continued into the next year. At this time, Cressman unearthed a number of sandals, with damage and charring, and used a chemical preservative to prevent further decay. Unknowing at the time, this would prevent radiocarbon dating of these artifacts. Cressman returned as an overseer to Stephen Bedwell in 1966 and 1967, to continue excavating the site. Upon their return, they found that the cave had been looted and vandalized, compromising the integrity of much of the area. However, a few areas under large fallen boulders were protected from disturbance, and were excavated at this time. Both periods of excavation provided limited documentation in comparison to modern archaeological data practices, causing issues for further archaeological study of the artifacts removed. Additionally, use of backhoes and dynamite at the site during the excavations in the 60s caused much destruction to the site. Some artifacts recovered during this second period of excavation were able to be dated by the Gakushiun Laboratory, generating further questioning of the integrity of the study, as this lab has generated erroneous data.

Archaeology

Anthropologist Luther Cressman and his team recovered a significant collection of artifacts from under the Mazama Ash, dating those artifacts to more than 7,000 years ago. This collection included wooden artifacts, stone tools, shell beads, obsidian, basket fragments, and, most famously, 95 sandals woven from sagebrush bark (some of these sandals are now displayed at the University of Oregon Museum of Natural and Cultural History and in the town of Fort Rock). While the dry climate helped preserve these ancient sandals, exposure to the ash caused most of them to be charred, leading to Cressman's decision to chemically preserve them. This sandal style is known as Fort Rock style, since they were first discovered there and is distinct from other variants; they are flat, closed toed and have a twined sole. They have been found at other sites, such as Cougar Mountain and Catlow Caves, as well. A local Fort Rock resident was responsible for finding a fragment of woven material which was eligible for dating, placing it around 9000 years ago. Some of these woven artifacts had diagonal twining and false embroidery decorative techniques, suggesting that these techniques were present in the region at that time. Additional artifacts found after the initial excavations included projectile points, obsidian and stone tools, and faunal remains, as well as more sandals. Calibrated radiocarbon dates from this set of artifacts estimated dates in the early Holocene period, approximately 10,000 years ago. The oldest dating from this site comes form a piece of charcoal dated to 13,000 BP, a date that has been debated by some archaeologists.

See also 
 Kennewick Man, skeletal remains discovered in the Pasco Basin
 Marmes Rockshelter, on the lower Snake River
 Paisley Caves, also in eastern Oregon, the site of perhaps the oldest human remains in the Americas

References

External links

Fort Rock Cave information from Oregon Parks and Recreation Department
Fort Rock Valley Historical Society

Caves of Oregon
National Historic Landmarks in Oregon
State parks of Oregon
Landforms of Lake County, Oregon
Protected areas of Lake County, Oregon
Archaeological sites on the National Register of Historic Places in Oregon
National Register of Historic Places in Lake County, Oregon
Pre-Clovis archaeological sites in the Americas
Archaeological sites in Oregon